Jefferson Avenue is a major, seven lane wide, north to south thoroughfare in the city of St. Louis, Missouri. For much of its run in south city Jefferson Avenue and Grand Boulevard take a parallel course, separated by about sixteen blocks. In the northern city, their concurrence varies some.

Transportation
Jefferson Avenue does not connect to the Metrolink light rail service, but MetroBus route 11 (Chippewa) does travel along much of the route.

Places on Jefferson Avenue 

 JeffVanderLou neighborhood
 St. Louis Place neighborhood
 Carr Square neighborhood
 Midtown neighborhood
 Downtown West neighborhood
 Gate District neighborhood
 Lafayette Square neighborhood
 McKinley Heights neighborhood
 Fox Park neighborhood
 Gravois Park, St. Louis neighborhood
 Marine Villa, St. Louis neighborhood
 Benton Park neighborhood
 Benton Park West neighborhood
 Jefferson Underground Building (2400 S. Jefferson Ave.) now home of Arch Reactor hackerspace

See also
 Streetcars in St. Louis, Missouri

References

Streets in St. Louis